Emumägi Landscape Conservation Area is a nature park in Lääne-Viru County, Estonia.

Its area is 510 ha.

The protected area was designated in 1959 to protect nature and landscapes of Väike-Maarja Raion (including Emumägi). In 1998, the protected area was redesigned to the landscape conservation area.

References

Nature reserves in Estonia
Geography of Lääne-Viru County